Willem van Brederode (1226/30 in Santpoort – 3 June 1285 in Velsen) was Lord of Brederode.

Life
He was the son of Dirk I van Brederode and Alvaradis van Heusden. William was only recognised as lord of Brederode in 1244, partially because he was a minor before that. Van Brederode accompanied William II, Count of Holland in his campaign against rebels above the Rhine in the Ruhr in 1248/49, and again in a campaign against the West Frisians in 1256. He was knighted in 1255, and appointed bailiff of Kennemerland in 1269. On 25 June 1282 he was awarded the rights to Goudriaan, Hardinxveld, Papendrecht, Peursum and Slingeland. William died in 1285 and was buried in the Brederode-chapel of the Engelmundus-church in Velsen.

Family and Children
In 1254 William married Hildegonde van Voorne, and they had six children:

Dirk II van Brederode, 1256–1318, William's successor
Alverade van Brederode, 1258 – after 1323
Rikairde van Brederode, ca. 1263 – after 1303
Floris I (Florentius) van Schoten (Adrichem), ca. 1265 – 1327
Aleid van Brederode, 1260–1333
Theodoricus de Scouten, before 1297 – unknown
William Ver Margrietsone van Brederode, unknown – after 1317
Theodorius van Schoten, 1270 – unknown

References
 Johannes a Leydis, Opusculum de gestis regalium abbatum monasterii sancti Athalberti ordinis sancti Benedicti in Egmonda (written between 1477 and 1484).
 Willem Procurator, (translated M. Gumbert-Hepp; J.P. Gumbert (ed.), Kroniek. Hilversum, Publisher Verloren, 2001

1285 deaths
William I
Year of birth uncertain
People from Velsen
13th-century people of the Holy Roman Empire